Mumbai massacre may refer to: 

1993 Bombay bombings
August 2003 Mumbai bombings
2006 Mumbai train bombings
2008 Mumbai attacks
2011 Mumbai bombings